Stenoptilia pelidnodactyla is a moth of the family Pterophoridae. It is found in most of Europe, except Portugal, Great Britain, Ireland, the Netherlands, Croatia, Greece, Lithuania and Ukraine.

The wingspan is 16–25 mm. Adults are on wing from May to September.

The larvae feed on meadow saxifrage (Saxifraga granulata), mossy saxifrage (Saxifraga bryoides), Saxifraga pedemontana, Saxifraga moschata, Saxifraga nervosa, Saxifraga prostii, Saxifraga exarata, Saxifraga aquatica, Saxifraga geranioides and Plantago sempervirens.

References

External links
lepiforum.de

pelidnodactyla
Moths described in 1837
Plume moths of Europe